The women's 5000 metres at the 2012 European Athletics Championships was held at the Helsinki Olympic Stadium on 28 June.

Medalists

Records

Schedule

Results

Final

References

 Final Results
Full results

5000 W
5000 metres at the European Athletics Championships
2012 in women's athletics